Tim Berni (born February 11, 2000) is a Swiss professional ice hockey defenseman who is currently playing with the Columbus Blue Jackets of the National Hockey League (NHL). He was selected by the Blue Jackets in the sixth-round, 159th overall, of the 2018 NHL Entry Draft.

Playing career
Berni made his professional debut during the 2017–18 season with the GCK Lions of the Swiss League (SL). He also made his National League (NL) debut that same season with the ZSC Lions, appearing in 8 games (0 point). On June 12, 2018, Berni signed his first professional contract, agreeing to a two-year optional contract with the ZSC Lions. His option was exercised on March 25, 2019, at the end of the relegation round.

On April 2, 2020, Berni signed a three-year entry-level contract with the Columbus Blue Jackets of the National Hockey League (NHL). He was returned to the ZSC Lions on a temporary loan by the Blue Jackets until the commencement of the delayed 2020–21 North American season on 14 August 2020.

International play
Berni was named to Switzerland's U20 national team for the 2018 World Junior Championships. He played 5 games, scoring no point. He made the team again for the 2019 World Junior Championships, playing all 7 games (2 assists) to help Switzerland finish 4th in the tournament. Berni was named to the team for the 2020 World Junior Championships, his last season of eligibility.

Personal life
Berni completed an apprenticeship at Allianz during his first years in Zurich.

Career statistics

Regular season and playoffs

International

References

External links

2000 births
Living people
Cleveland Monsters players
Columbus Blue Jackets draft picks
Columbus Blue Jackets players
GCK Lions players
Swiss ice hockey defencemen
People from Meilen District
ZSC Lions players
Sportspeople from the canton of Zürich